Mike McCormack (born 1965) is an Irish novelist and short-story writer.  He has published two collections of short stories, Getting It In the Head and Forensic Songs and three novels - Crowe's Requiem, Notes from a Coma and Solar Bones. He has been described as  "a disgracefully neglected writer".

McCormack was born in London. He grew up on a farm in Louisburgh, County Mayo, and studied English and philosophy at UCG. In 1996, he was awarded the Rooney Prize for Irish Literature. In 1998, Getting It In the Head was voted a New York Times Notable Book of the Year. A story from the collection, "The Terms", was adapted into an award-winning short film directed by Johnny O'Reilly.

In 2006, Notes from a Coma was shortlisted for the Irish Book of the Year Award. In 2010, John Waters in The Irish Times described it as "the greatest Irish novel of the decade just ended". It took McCormack seven years to write the book.
In May 2016, Dublin publisher Tramp Press published his novel Solar Bones; this went on to win the Goldsmiths Prize. The book was unusual in that it was written as a single sentence (albeit a long one, that spans about 270 pages). Also in 2016, the book was named "Novel of the Year" by the Irish Book Awards.

He was elected to Aosdána in 2018.

In June 2018, McCormack won the Dublin Literary prize of €100,000, the largest literary prize in the world for a single novel published in English, for his book Solar Bones.

He lives in Galway with his wife Maeve, where he works as a lecturer and director of NUI Galway's BA in Creative Writing.

Writings
 1996 - Getting It In the Head
 1998 - Crowe's Requiem
 2005 - Notes from a Coma
 2012 - Forensic Songs
 2016 - Solar Bones

See also
 List of members of Aosdána

References

External links

 http://www.irishtimes.com/newspaper/weekend/2005/0514/1115939702309.html
 Mike McCormack reading his short story "Drink Drink Driving Heart Attacks" introduced by John Kenny (video)
 The Terms (2000) at the Internet Movie Database
 http://www.tramppress.com/

1965 births
Living people
Alumni of the University of Galway
Aosdána members
Irish male short story writers
People from County Mayo
People from Galway (city)
Writers from London
21st-century Irish novelists
Irish male novelists
21st-century Irish short story writers
21st-century Irish male writers
Goldsmiths Prize winners